The German DRB Class 06 engines were standard steam locomotives (Einheitsdampflokomotiven) with the Deutsche Reichsbahn (DRB) designed to haul express train services. They were the only German locomotives with a 4-8-4 (Northern) wheel arrangement.

History 
The two Class 06 locomotives built by the firm of Krupp in 1939 were the largest, heaviest and most powerful locomotives in the Deutsche Reichsbahn. They were built for heavy express train duties in hilly terrain. The performance requirement was for the transportation of 650 tons at 120 km/h. On ramps of 1:100 it was to still be capable of maintaining 60 km/h.

The Class 06 was given the same boiler as the Class 45 and many of the same components as the Class 41. The running gear, with four coupled axles, had a wheelbase of 6,75 m.

In trials, the vehicles confirmed their remarkable capability and running qualities. However the locomotives tended to derail in tight turnout curves. And, like the Class 45s, the boilers developed cracks, leaky tubes and popped stay bolts, so that the locomotives were unconvincing when hauling measurement vehicles or scheduled trains.

As a result of the war no more were produced. After the Second World War there was no longer a requirement for a locomotive of this size, so that neither the necessary structural modification of the engines was carried out, nor did any follow-on orders result. Both engines were seen as having a faulty design and were retired by the Deutsche Bundesbahn in 1951 in Frankfurt am Main and scrapped, because the DB refused to replace their boilers.

The two locomotives, which had operating numbers 06 001 and 06 002, were equipped with 2'3 T 38 St tenders.

See also
 List of DRG locomotives and railbuses

References

External links 
 Photograph of the Class 06

06
4-8-4 locomotives
06
Krupp locomotives
Railway locomotives introduced in 1939
Streamlined steam locomotives
Standard gauge locomotives of Germany
2′D2′ h3 locomotives
Passenger locomotives